Alfred H. Farman (April 1869 – November 1926.) was an English footballer who played as a forward. Born in Kings Norton, Birmingham, he played for Birmingham Excelsior, Aston Villa and Bolton Wanderers before joining Newton Heath in early 1889. He played in three friendlies before the end of the 1888–89 season, scoring a goal in each of them. He was in the Heathens' team that first joined the Football Alliance in the 1889–90 season, and finally made his competitive debut on 9 November 1889 in a 3–0 home win over Long Eaton Rangers, in which he scored a goal. At Newton Heath, which was later renamed Manchester United, he scored 53 goals in 121 appearances, before leaving in June 1895.

He played for them in their two seasons in the First Division and for one season after they were relegated to the Second Division. He scored a hat-trick in Newton Heath's first game at their new ground at Bank Street against Burnley on 2 September 1893, and also scored the first penalty in English football history during a friendly between Newton Heath and Blackpool on 5 September 1891.

Career statistics

References

External links
Profile at StretfordEnd.co.uk
Profile at MUFCInfo.com

1869 births
Association football forwards
English footballers
Birmingham Excelsior F.C. players
Aston Villa F.C. players
Bolton Wanderers F.C. players
Manchester United F.C. players
1926 deaths
People from Kings Norton
Football Alliance players